Theater Neu-Ulm is a theatre in Neu-Ulm, Bavaria, Germany.

Theatres in Bavaria